Things and places known as Nun's Well or St Nun's Well include:
 Nun's Well, Gibraltar
 Nun's Well, Cannock Wood
 Nun's Well, part of the nunnery adjoined to Greyfriars, Richmond
 Nun's Well at Sedgwick Castle
 St Nun's Well in Altarnun
 St Nun's Well in Pelynt